Polish–Lithuanian can refer to:
 Polish–Lithuanian union (1385–1569)
 Polish–Lithuanian Commonwealth (1569–1795)
 Polish-Lithuanian identity as used to describe groups, families, or individuals with histories in the Polish–Lithuanian Commonwealth
 Lithuania–Poland relations (since 1918)
 Polish minority in Lithuania
 Lithuanian minority in Poland